Hélène Zannier (born 19 September 1972) is a French politician representing La République En Marche! She was elected to the French National Assembly on 18 June 2017, representing the Moselle's 7th constituency.

See also
 2017 French legislative election

References

1972 births
Living people
Deputies of the 15th National Assembly of the French Fifth Republic
La République En Marche! politicians
21st-century French women politicians
Place of birth missing (living people)
Women members of the National Assembly (France)